Laj (also Romanized as Lej; also known as Liadzh, Liaj, and Līj) is a village in Mokriyan-e Sharqi Rural District, in the Central District of Mahabad County, West Azerbaijan Province, Iran. At the 2006 census, its population was 1,297, in 237 families.

References 

Populated places in Mahabad County